Kudremukha is a mountain range and name of a peak located in Chikamagaluru district,  in Karnataka, India. It is also the name of a small hill station iron ore mining town situated near the mountain, about 20 kilometres from Kalasa, in Kalasa Taluk. The name Kuduremukha  literally means 'horse-faced (Kannada) and refers to a particular picturesque view of a side of the mountain that resembles a horse's face.  It was also referred to as 'Samseparvata', historically since it was approached from Samse village. Kuduremukha is Karnataka's 2nd highest peak after Mullayanagiri and 26th highest peak in western ghats. The nearest International Airport is at Mangalore which is at a distance of 99 kilometres.

Location
The Kudremukha National Park (latitude 13°01'00" to 13°29'17" N, longitude 75°00'55' to 75°25'00" E) is the second-largest Wildlife Protected Area (600.32  km2) belonging to a tropical wet evergreen type of forest in the Western Ghats. Kudremukha National Park is located at the tri-junction of Dakshina Kannada, Udupi District and, Chikamagaluru district of Karnataka. The Western Ghats is one of the thirty-four hotspots identified for biodiversity conservation in the world. Kudremukha National Park comes under the Global Tiger Conservation Priority-I, under the format developed jointly by the Wildlife Conservation Society (WCS) and World Wide Fund-USA.

Geography

The southern and western sides of the park form the steep slope of the Western Ghats ridgeline, with the altitude varying from 100 m - 1892 m (peak). The northern, central, and eastern portions of the park constitute a chain of rolling hills with a mosaic of natural grassland and shola forests. Kudremukha receives an average annual rainfall of 7000 mm, largely due to the forest types of mainly evergreen vegetation that can be found here.

History

National park
Well known environmentalist and tiger expert, K Ullas Karanth undertook a detailed and systematic survey of the distribution of the endangered lion-tailed macaque in Karnataka during 1983-84 with support from the Government of Karnataka. He observed that suitable and extensive rainforest habitat for the lion-tailed macaque existed in Kudremukha and that the tract probably harboured the largest contiguous population of lion-tailed macaques in the Western Ghats, outside the Malabar region. He further suggested that lion-tailed macaques could be effectively used as a 'flagship' species to conserve the entire biotic community in the region and prepared a conservation plan for the survival of wild populations of lion-tailed macaques in the region delineating the present national park area as a proposed nature reserve. Based on his report, the Karnataka State Wildlife Advisory Board suggested to the government that Kudremukha National Park be created.

Three important rivers, the Tunga, the Bhadra and the Nethravathi are said to have their origin here. A shrine of goddess Bhagavathi and a Varaha image, 1.8 m within a cave are the main attractions. The Tunga River and Bhadra River flow freely through the parklands. The area of the Kadambi waterfalls is a definite point of interest for anyone who travels to the spot. The animals found there include malabar civets, wild dogs, sloth bears and spotted deer.

Opposition to national park
 
People residing inside the national park did not welcome the idea of such a concept, as it involves eviction and Kudremukha Rashtriya Udyana Virodhi Okoota, an NGO, fights on behalf of people residing inside the forest and opposes the formation of the national park. To curb the supposed Naxalite activity inside the premises, police opened fire on activists and killed five suspected Naxalites on 10 July 2007.

Conservation
After years of campaigning by environmentalists, Kudremukha was declared a National Park in 1987

Ecology 

A diverse assemblage of endangered large mammals is found in the park supporting three large mammal predator species such as the tiger, leopard and wild dog. The important tiger prey base found within the park is gaur, sambar, wild pig, muntjac, chevrotain, bonnet macaque, common langur and the lion-tailed macaque.

The wet climate and the tremendous water retentive capacity of the shola grasslands and forests have led to the formation of thousands of perennial streams in the region converging to form three major rivers of the region, Tunga, Bhadra and Nethravathi which form an important lifeline for the people of Karnataka and Andhra Pradesh. Lobo's house is an old abandoned farm on the upper reaches of Kuduremukha.

Trekking in Kudremukha

Mining town

The Kudremukha township developed primarily as an iron ore mining town where the government ran Kudremukha Iron Ore Company Ltd. (KIOCL). This public sector company operated for almost 30 years but was closed in 2006 due to environmental issues. The company proposed eco-tourism in the area and insisted that the land lease be renewed for 99 years. However, environmentalists opposed such an idea because the area should be given time to regenerate completely rest. Thus, the mining lease lapsed on 24 July 1999. The mining town now known as Kudremukha originally known as  Malleshwara village whose residents have relocated to Jamble village of Kalasa taluk in the 1970s. Mining town had 3 schools named Giri Jyothi Convent School, Kendriya Vidyalaya (KV Kudremukh)  & Government school, which had an education from Nursery to class 12.

Demographics
 India census, Kudremukha town had a population of 8095. Males constitute 54% of the population, while females constitute 46%. Kudremukha has an average literacy rate of 80%, which is higher than the national average of 59.5%; male literacy is 83% while female literacy is 77%. 11% of the population is under six years of age.

Threats

Kudremukha Iron Ore Company Limited (KIOCL) is a government-run company that was mining iron ore from the Kudremukha hills. KIOCL conducted its operations in an area of 4,604.55 ha for over 20 years. Opposition to its activities built up over the years from environmentalists and wildlife conservationists who were concerned about the threat to the region's flora and fauna, and farmers who were affected by the pollution of the streams that originated in the mining area. KIOCL has been banned from operating in this beautiful Natural Reserve, according to a Supreme Court order.

The rainfall in Kudremukh, which is one of the highest for any open cast mining operation in the world, greatly accentuates the impacts of siltation as claimed by environmentalists. The topographic and rainfall characteristics in combination with the open cast mining of low-grade iron ore and other land-surface disturbances caused by the KIOCL operations resulted in very high sediment discharge, with over 60% of the total siltation in the Bhadra system being contributed by the mining area which forms less than six per cent of the catchment. With high-quality practices adopted by KIOCL to mine, the flora and fauna remained intact, causing no adverse effects on nature .

KIOCL used to send iron ore through pipes running through districts of Udupi and Dakshina Kannada and converted to pellets at their plant in Panambur.

See also

 Baba Budangiri
 Chikmagalur
 Hanumangundi Falls
 Kalasa
 Karkala
 Kemmanagundi
 Mangalore
 Mullayangiri

References

External links

kudremukha trek
Checklist of Amphibians reported from Kudremukha National Park
Checklist of Aquatic Insects reported from Kudremukha National Park
Checklist of Birds reported from Kudremukha National Park
Checklist of Butterflies reported from Kudremukha National Park
Checklist of Fishes reported from Kudremukha National Park
Checklist of Mammals reported from Kudremukha National Park
Checklist of Non-Woody Plants reported from Kudremukha National Park
Checklist of Reptiles reported from Kudremukha National Park

Mountains of the Western Ghats
National parks in Karnataka
Iron ore mining in India
Mountains of Karnataka
Hill stations in Karnataka
Populated places in the Western Ghats
Protected areas established in 1916
Cities and towns in Chikkamagaluru district
Mountain ranges of India
Geography of Chikkamagaluru district
Tourist attractions in Chikkamagaluru district